Triuncina diaphragma is a moth in the family Bombycidae. It was described by Rudolf Mell in 1958. It is found in China and Vietnam.

References

Bombycidae
Moths described in 1958